Rolly View is a hamlet in central Alberta, Canada within Leduc County.

Demographics 

Religious assemblies 
St. Paul's Lutheran Church (established in 1896)

See also 
List of communities in Alberta
List of hamlets in Alberta

References 

Designated places in Alberta
Hamlets in Alberta
Leduc County